A philomath is a person with a love of learning.

Philomath may also refer to:

People
 Benjamin Franklin, who used this pen-name
 Jonathan Swift, who wrote as T. N. Philomath

Literature
 Philomathes, a character in a dissertation by King James VI and I titled Daemonologie
 Philomathes, a main character in the theatrical comic interlude Studentes (1545/49) by Christoph Stymmelius

Organisations
 Philomaths, Polish secret student organization that existed, 1817-23, at the Imperial University of Vilnius.
Philomathean Club, a women's club in Stockton, California, founded in 1896
 Philomathean Society, a literary society at the University of Pennsylvania
 Philomathean Literary Society (Erskine College)
 Philomathean Society (New York University)

Places and schools
Philomathean Clubhouse, historic building of the women's club in Stockton, California
 Philomath, Georgia
 Philomath, Indiana
 Philomath, Oregon, home of:
 Philomath High School
 Philomath School District

Publications
 Philomath Bulletin, a weekly newspaper of Philomath, Oregon